KCAU-TV (channel 9) is a television station in Sioux City, Iowa, United States, affiliated with ABC and owned by Nexstar Media Group. The station's studios are located on Gordon Drive in Sioux City, and its transmitter is located near Hinton, Iowa.

The first television station in the region, the station began broadcasting as CBS affiliate KVTV in 1953. It was acquired in 1965 by a company that became known as Forward Communications; under Forward stewardship, the station activated a  tower, changed its call sign to KCAU-TV and its affiliation to ABC in 1967, and became the leading station in the market through the 1980s. It was owned by Citadel Communications from 1985 to 2014, when it was purchased by Nexstar.

History

Early years
The Cowles Company, which owned WNAX in Yankton, South Dakota, filed on June 30, 1952, to build a new television station on channel 9 in Sioux City. The Federal Communications Commission (FCC) approved on November 19, after a competing application from Siouxland Television Company merged into the Cowles bid; it was the second construction permit granted for a station in the city after one for UHF channel 36. A downtown office was set up on Pierce Street, and the transmitting facility was built north of the city at 41st and Howard streets. The call letters KVTV were selected; the station could not be WNAX-TV because it was not in Yankton.

KVTV began broadcasting on March 29, 1953. It was affiliated with CBS, NBC, and DuMont, with ABC coming on board shortly after launch. When KTIV signed on in 1954, NBC programming moved there, and the two stations split DuMont (until that network folded) and ABC. In 1956, KVTV moved to the former municipal auditorium at Seventh and Douglas streets in downtown Sioux City. The 1909 structure had previously functioned as Sioux City's municipal auditorium, a meeting place for fraternal organizations, and as the Tomba Ballroom.

One of the first programs on the new station was a children's show hosted by Jim Henry, who was approached to see if he knew anyone who would be a good host but could not recommend anyone else. His Brooklyn accent made him an odd fit for a Western-themed kids' program, but Canyon Kid's Corner endured on the air. 

In late 1957, Cowles sold WNAX and KVTV to the Peoples Broadcasting Corporation, a subsidiary of Nationwide Mutual Insurance Company, for $3 million. KVTV began producing a regular series of bowling telecasts in conjunction with KELO-TV of Sioux Falls, South Dakota. The Big Bowl, which was produced in Sioux City and aired until 1973, featured competitors from the two cities facing off against each other and was credited with increasing bowling's popularity regionally. Also under Peoples, the station erected its first weather ball atop the Badgerow Building, which remained in place until it was destroyed in a 1973 windstorm.

Forward ownership
In 1965, Peoples sold KVTV to the Wisconsin Valley Television Company of Wausau, Wisconsin, owner of WSAU AM-FM-TV in Wausau and WMTV in Madison. That December, after seven years of joint work and the withdrawal of an objection by KQTV in Fort Dodge, KVTV moved to a new tower near Hinton, Iowa, that it co-owned with KTIV. The former tower was dismantled; the land was sold to the Sioux City school system to build North High School, and the antenna was gifted to South Dakota Educational Television, which used it as a backup for its KBHE in Rapid City.

Bigger changes were in store beyond a new tower. In 1967, Forward Communications—which changed its name from Wisconsin Valley at the start of the year owing to its expansion outside the state—changed the station's call letters to KCAU-TV to "reflect the new character of the station" and switched network affiliation from CBS to ABC. At the time, neither Sioux City nor Sioux Falls had an ABC affiliate. With Sioux Falls CBS affiliate KELO-TV about to activate a 2,000-foot tower of its own and other nearby stations airing CBS, Forward concluded there would be a larger audience for an ABC station. The station advertised in the Argus Leader in Sioux Falls, staking a claim to be the ABC affiliate for both Sioux City and Sioux Falls.

While Sioux City viewers would turn to new station KMEG-TV (channel 14), originally planned as an ABC affiliate, for their CBS programs, the Forward ownership and affiliation switch ushered in the strongest years in station history, living up to the "Major 9" moniker adopted around the same time. William F. Turner served as general manager of KCAU-TV from 1966 to 1985, and the station spent most of that time as the market leader in Sioux City; at its height, it had a nearly 2-to-1 ratings lead over KTIV. KCAU-TV also had a large audience in Sioux Falls, where the only other receivable ABC affiliate was KORN-TV/KXON-TV/KDLT in Mitchell, South Dakota. However, the station started to lose ground in the early 1980s in large part because of an affiliation switch in Sioux Falls. When ABC moved its Sioux Falls affiliation to KSFY-TV in 1983, the factor that gave KCAU-TV a ratings advantage disappeared, and KTIV—which had been improving its coverage steadily for several years—surged past KCAU-TV for first place. Forward Communications was sold in late 1984 to Wesray Capital Corporation, which retained the Forward name for its media holdings.

Citadel ownership
Wesray intended all along to sell some of Forward's television properties and its four radio stations, and KCAU-TV was the first to find a buyer. In July 1985, KCAU-TV was purchased for $14 million by Citadel Communications, a company owned by Phil Lombardo. General manager Turner exited, receiving a standing ovation from staff. Days after closing on the purchase, Lombardo put his stamp on the station on November 18, 1985, firing 22 staffers in what a front-page headline of the Sioux City Journal termed a "purge" of a third of the staff; he was reported to have called KCAU-TV "hemorrhaging" and in need of "major surgery". Among those to lose their jobs was Jim Henry; Canyon Kid's Corner, by then a weekly show, was cancelled after 32 years on the air and more than 70,000 guests.

Citadel's first priority upon taking ownership was to stabilize the newsroom. It was able to lure popular anchor Greg Lund back to the market from a job in Little Rock, Arkansas, in 1986. A decline in agricultural advertising and the difficulties of airing a noon newscast for an ABC station in the Central Time Zone prompted the station to shelve its midday news in 1987. A local 5 p.m. newscast was added in 1999.

In 1994, popular weather presenter Tom Peterson died in a car crash in Minnesota. Some 1,000 people attended his funeral. The station also revived the weather ball in 1995, this time atop the Terra Centre (now Ho-Chunk Centre) office building.

KCAN

Citadel also sought to expand KCAU-TV's circulation to the southwest. In 1986, the company acquired KBGT-TV, a struggling independent station in Albion, Nebraska, from the Amaturo Group, and converted it into a satellite station as KCAN (call letters that matched KCAU-TV and also reflected the major cities served of Columbus, Albion, and Norfolk). The FCC approved the deal because it agreed with Citadel's contention that Albion could not support its own TV station, and ABC approved extending the affiliation because some of the households reached by its transmitter did not receive ABC from another station. The deal, which would add 463,000 viewers to the station's potential audience, did not include KBGT's satellite studio in Lincoln, Nebraska.

KCAN continued as a complement to KCAU-TV for more than a decade, but beginning in 1991, Citadel began efforts to move the station south to Lincoln, which only had one full-service commercial TV station. A new UHF station would replace it at Albion. KOLN, the existing commercial station in Lincoln, and several stations in Omaha challenged the proposal, but the FCC gave initial approval in April 1993 and final approval in June 1995. It became a standalone station, KLKN, on April 1, 1996.

Nexstar ownership
On September 16, 2013, Citadel announced that it would sell KCAU-TV, along with WOI-DT in Des Moines and WHBF-TV in Rock Island, Illinois, to the Nexstar Broadcasting Group for $88 million. Nexstar immediately took over the station's operations through a time brokerage agreement. The deal separated KCAU from KLKN, which Citadel retained. Citadel's sale of the three stations followed Phil Lombardo's decision to "slow down", as well as a desire by Lynch Entertainment, an investor in WOI and WHBF, to sell. The sale was completed on March 13, 2014.

Soon after the acquisition, the new ownership deemed the downtown studio inadequate for the station's needs and began a search for a new site. In February 2017, the station relocated to a state-of-the-art facility located on the city's east side.

Notable former on-air staff
 John Behring
 Ron Clements 
 Gene Sherman
 Kent Shocknek

Technical information

Subchannels
The station's digital signal is multiplexed:

At the start of July 2021, Flood Communications, the owner of the low-power News Channel Nebraska system, began to simulcast KCAU's main channel as a subchannel of KNEN-LD (channel 35), which serves Norfolk, Nebraska.

Analog-to-digital conversion
KCAU-TV shut down its analog signal, over VHF channel 9, at noon on February 17, 2009, which had been the official date of the federally mandated transition from analog to digital television until it was changed earlier that month to June 12. The station's digital transmissions moved from UHF channel 30 to channel 9.

See also
List of masts

References

External links

ABC network affiliates
Ion Mystery affiliates
Bounce TV affiliates
Laff (TV network) affiliates
Nationwide Communications
Television channels and stations established in 1953
CAU-TV
Nexstar Media Group